Ammal is a town and commune in Algeria.

It may also refer to: 

 Anjalai Ammal, an Indian freedom fighter.
 C. Kolandai Ammal, an Indian educator, writer, broadcaster and politician.
 Janaki Ammal, an Indian botanist.
 Kothainayaki Ammal, a Tamil writer, novelist, and journalist. 
 K.P. Janaki Ammal, an Indian politician.
 Mayavaram Saraswathi Ammal, an Indian classical flautist.
 Rockstar Ramani Ammal, an Indian folk and playback singer.